Antoinette is a French feminine given name.

Antoinette may also refer to:
 Antoinette (manufacturer), an early French manufacturer of engines, aircraft and cars
 Antoinette (barque), a Canadian ship wrecked on the Doom Bar
 Jean-Étienne Antoinette (born 1966), French Guianan politician
 Antoinette (rapper), American rapper Antoinette Lovell Patterson (born 1970)
 a title character of Antoine and Antoinette, a 1947 French comedy film directed by Jacques Becker
Antoinette (film), a 1932 French comedy film

See also
 Antoinette Perry Award for Excellence in Broadway Theatre, better known as the Tony Award
 Marie Antoinette (1755–1793), Queen of France